The 1912–13 United States Senate elections were held on various dates in various states. They were the last U.S. Senate elections before the ratification of the Seventeenth Amendment in 1913, establishing direct elections for all Senate seats. Senators had been primarily chosen by state legislatures. Senators were elected over a wide range of time throughout 1912 and 1913, and a seat may have been filled months late or remained vacant due to legislative deadlock. Some states elected their senators directly even before passage of Seventeenth Amendment. Oregon pioneered direct election and experimented with different measures over several years until it succeeded in 1907. Soon after, Nebraska followed suit and laid the foundation for other states to adopt measures reflecting the people's will. By 1912, as many as 29 states elected senators either as nominees of their party's primary or in conjunction with a general election.

In these elections, terms were up for the senators in Class 2. The Democrats gained control of the Senate for the first time in 20 years. Of the 32 seats up for election, 17 were won by Democrats, thereby gaining 4 seats from the Republicans.  Two seats were unfilled by state legislators who failed to elect a new senator on time.

These elections coincided with Democrat Woodrow Wilson's victory in the presidential election amid a divide in the Republican Party. In the Senate, Joseph M. Dixon and Miles Poindexter defected from the Republican Party and joined Theodore Roosevelt's new Progressive Party. Dixon, however, lost his seat during this election.

Results summary

Change in composition

Before the elections

Results of elections before the next Congress

Beginning of the next Congress, March 4, 1913

Beginning of the first session, April 7, 1913

Complete list of races

Special elections during the 62nd Congress 
In these special elections, the winners were seated in the 62nd Congress during 1912 or before March 4, 1913; ordered by election date.

Races leading to the 63rd Congress 

In these regular elections, the winner was seated on March 4, 1913; ordered by state.

All of the elections involved the Class 2 seats.

Early election to the following Congress 
In this early general election, the winner was seated in the 64th Congress, starting March 4, 1915.

Elections during the 63rd Congress 
In these elections (some special, some merely late), the winners were seated in 1913 after March 4.

Some of those five elections late and some special, some by legislatures before ratification of the amendment and some popularly thereafter:
 Two elections were late and elected by legislatures: New Hampshire and Illinois (Class 2)
 One election was special and elected by a legislature: Illinois (Class 3)
 One election was late and elected popularly: Georgia
 One election was special and elected popularly: Maryland

They are ordered here by election date, then by class.

Alabama 

Incumbent Senator John H. Bankhead had already been re-elected early January 17, 1911 for the 1913 term.

Arkansas 

One-term incumbent Senator Jeff Davis died January 3, 1913.  Democratic Governor of Arkansas Joseph T. Robinson appointed John N. Heiskell January 6, 1913 to continue the term just until a special election.

Arkansas (special) 

John N. Heiskell was not a candidate in the special election. On January 29, 1913, the Arkansas Legislature elected Democratic businessman and former judge William Marmaduke Kavanaugh just to finish the term that would end in March 1913.

Arkansas (regular) 

Neither Heiskell nor Kavanaugh were candidates in the general election. On January 29, 1913, the Arkansas Legislature elected the Democratic Governor Joseph T. Robinson to the next term.  This would be the last senate election by a state legislature before the April 8, 1913 adoption of the 17th amendment. Robinson would later become leader of Senate Democrats and Senate majority leader.

Arizona 

Arizona became a new state February 14, 1912, with senators in classes 1 (ending 1917) and 3 (ending 1915).  For the initial senators there was a popular vote held December 12, 1911 — before statehood — and the newly formed state legislature effectively ratified the popular votes March 26, 1912: Democrat Henry F. Ashurst (class 1) and Democrat Marcus A. Smith (class 3).

Henry F. Ashurst was elected to the Territorial House of Representatives in 1897. He was re-elected in 1899, and became the territory's youngest speaker. In 1902, he was elected to the Territorial Senate. In 1911, Ashurst presided over Arizona's constitutional convention. During the convention, he positioned himself for a U.S. Senate seat by avoiding the political fighting over various clauses in the constitution which damaged his rivals.

Marcus A. Smith announced his candidacy for one of Arizona's two senate seats on September 24, 1911.  As the campaign began, Smith abandoned his long standing conservative stand and declared himself a "Progressive".

With the admission of Arizona as a state in 1912, the Arizona State Legislature confirmed the selection of Smith and Ashurst as the state's first U.S. senators on March 27, 1912, taking office April 2, 1912.

Colorado 

On January 14, 1913, the Colorado General Assembly elected both of the state's senators: Governor John F. Shafroth for the class 2 seat (ending 1919) and Democrat Charles S. Thomas for the class 3 seat (ending 1915).

Colorado (regular) 

One-term Republican incumbent Simon Guggenheim chose to retire in the term beginning March 4, 1913.

In the 1912 state elections, Democratic Governor of Colorado John F. Shafroth won the popular vote.

The Colorado General Assembly ratified that decision January 14, 1913 by electing Thomas.

Colorado (special) 

Democrat Charles J. Hughes Jr. (D) had died January 11, 1911 and the seat remained vacant for two years because the Colorado General Assembly failed to elect a successor.

In the 1912 state elections, Democrat Charles S. Thomas (former Governor of Colorado) won the popular vote, and the Colorado General Assembly ratified that decision January 14, 1913 by overwhelmingly voting for Thomas.

Delaware 

Incumbent Republican Harry A. Richardson retired after one term in office.

Democrat Willard Saulsbury Jr. had been a member of the Democratic National Committee since 1908 and had run for U.S. senator in 1899, 1901, 1903, 1905, 1907, and 1911, but Republicans controlled the state legislature and he was unsuccessful. In 1913, however, Democrats were in control of the legislature, Saulsbury was the preference of most Democrats, and he obtained the required majority January 29, 1913 after several days of balloting.

Georgia 

The Georgia General Assembly failed to elect a senator, as Democratic incumbent Augustus O. Bacon's term ended.  The Governor of Georgia therefore appointed Bacon to begin the term, pending a late election.

On June 15, 1913 Bacon was elected by the general populace without opposition, becoming the first senator elected under the Seventeenth Amendment to the United States Constitution.

Bacon died in early 1914, however, leading to another interim appointment and eventual special election.

Idaho

Idaho (regular) 

First term Republican incumbent William Borah was easily re-elected over two Democratic challengers.

Idaho (special) 

Two-term incumbent Republican Weldon Heyburn died October 17, 1912.  Democratic lawyer and former-Judge Kirtland I. Perky was appointed November 18, 1912 to continue the term pending a special election.

Perky was not a candidate in the special election, which was won by Republican former-Governor James H. Brady.  Brady would win re-election in a popular vote in 1914.

Illinois 

In the November 1912 state elections, the Republicans lost control of the state due to the Republican / Progressive split. But while the Democrats held a plurality of the Illinois General Assembly, they did not have a majority. The General Assembly took up the matter of electing the senators on February 1. The General Assembly therefore failed to elect until after the new congress began.

On March 26, in a compromise arranged by governor Dunne, the General Assembly elected Democrat J. Hamilton Lewis to fill the full-term seat and Republican Lawrence Y. Sherman to fill the two remaining years of a vacancy that had just recently opened.

Illinois (regular) 

On April 12, 1912, five-term Republican incumbent Shelby Moore Cullom lost renomination to Lieutenant Governor of Illinois Lawrence Y. Sherman in the Republican "advisory" primary, where the voters expressed their preference for senator but the decision was not binding on the General Assembly, which made the actual choice. Cullom had suffered politically over his support for the other Illinois senator, William Lorimer, who was embroiled in a scandal over alleged bribery in his 1909 election to the Senate.

After his defeat, Cullom withdrew his name from consideration by the General Assembly.

The Illinois General Assembly eventually elected the Democratic nominee, Congressman J. Hamilton Lewis March 26, 1913, who had also won the Democratic advisory primary, as the sole candidate on the ballot.

Illinois (special) 

Three months after the primary in which Sherman defeated Cullom, the U.S. Senate invalidated Lorimer's 1909 election and declared the seat vacant. The Illinois Attorney General, William H. Stead determined that the General Assembly had failed to properly elect Lorimer in 1909 and so the Governor could not appoint a replacement. As a result, the General Assembly had a second Senate seat to fill.

Iowa 

Incumbent Republican William S. Kenyon, who had just won a 1911 special election to the seat, was easily re-elected by the Iowa General Assembly over Democratic former congressman Daniel W. Hamilton.

Kansas 

One-term incumbent Republican (and future Vice President) Charles Curtis lost renomination to Governor of Kansas Walter R. Stubbs, who then lost the general election to Democratic Judge William H. Thompson as Democrats took control of the Kansas Legislature in the 1912 state elections.

Thompson would only serve one term, losing re-election in 1918. As of 2022, this is the last time the Democrats won the Class 2 Senate seat in Kansas. This represents the longest current winning streak of either party for a single Senate seat.

Curtis, meanwhile, would rebound in the to the other seat, he defeated Kansas' senior senator Joseph L. Bristow in the Republican primary, he would then win re-election to the U.S Senate by a very narrow margin over two opponents, becoming the first Kansan to be popularly elected to the U.S Senate in a historic first. Curtis would serve in the Senate for three terms before resigning to become U.S. Vice President in March 1929, the first American Indian to serve in that office.

Kentucky 

One-term Democrat Thomas H. Paynter retired and Democratic Representative Ollie James was easily elected January 16, 1912.

The legislature formally elected James a second time January 16, 1912, to comply with a federal rule requiring an election on the second Tuesday after the meeting of the legislature.

Louisiana 

Louisiana held two elections May 21, 1912: an election for the class 2 term that would begin March 4, 1913 and an election for the class 3 term that would begin March 4, 1915.

Louisiana (regular, class 2) 

In the class 2 seat, Democrat Murphy J. Foster lost renomination to fellow-Democrat Joseph E. Ransdell, who later was elected unopposed to seat.

Louisiana (regular, class 3) 

In the class 3 seat, Democrat John Thornton retired. Fellow-Democrat Robert F. Broussard was elected unopposed, but he would have to wait until term began on March 4, 1915.

Maine 

Five-term incumbent Republican William P. Frye had died August 8, 1911 and Democrat Obadiah Gardner was appointed September 23, 1911 to continue the term, pending a special election. In this election cycle, Gardner would first win the election to finish the term and then lose re-election to the next term.

Maine (special) 

Democratic interim appointee Obadiah Gardner was elected April 2, 1912 to finish the term ending March 3, 1913.

Maine (regular) 

Democrat Obadiah Gardner lost re-election January 15, 1913 to Republican Edwin C. Burleigh for the term starting March 4, 1913.

"There was no choice in the separate balloting on January 14.  The next day in joint assembly, [Burleigh was elected]."

Maryland (special) 

Democrat Isidor Rayner died November 25, 1912 and Republican William P. Jackson was appointed to continue the term, pending a special election.

Democratic state senator Blair Lee was elected November 4, 1913.

Lee presented his credentials to serve as senator on December 5, 1913, but he did not qualify until January 28, 1914 because Jackson claimed that "since [Jackson] had been appointed under the original constitutional provision, [Jackson] was entitled to hold his seat until the regularly scheduled adjournment date of the Maryland state assembly." The Senate considered Jackson's challenge but eventually rejected it and seated Lee.

Lee would only serve this one term, as he lost renomination in 1916.

Massachusetts 

Republican Winthrop M. Crane, who was first appointed in 1904, retired.  Republican congressman from Newton, Massachusetts, John W. Weeks, was elected January 14, 1913 to succeed him.  Republican Eben Sumner Draper had been considered a candidate for the seat, but the Republican party, then under the control of its hardline conservative faction (and in control of the legislature), chose Weeks instead.

Weeks would only serve for one six-year term.  He would lose re-election in 1918 to Democrat David I. Walsh.

Michigan 

Two-term Republican William A. Smith, whose Senate tenure began weeks before his first full-term began, was re-elected January 14, 1913.

He would retire after this term.

Minnesota 

Three-term Republican Knute Nelson was overwhelmingly supported in a 1912 popular election.

The Minnesota Legislature unanimously ratified the popular vote January 21, 1913:

Nelson later would be re-elected again in 1918 to a fifth term, before his 1923 death.

Mississippi 

One-term Democrat LeRoy Percy lost renomination in mid-1911 to white supremacist James K. Vardaman, who was then elected January 16, 1912 to the seat, unopposed.

Percy had won in 1910 (to finish a vacant term) despite Vardaman's support of a plurality of legislators (all white). The fractured remainder sought to thwart his extreme racial policies. A majority united behind Percy to block Vardaman's election.  Percy had advocated education for blacks and worked to improve race relations by appealing to the planters' sense of noblesse oblige. Disenfranchisement of blacks made the Democratic primary the deciding competitive race for state and local offices in Mississippi.

In this rematch, Vardaman's campaign was managed by Lieutenant Governor of Mississippi (and future senator) Theodore Bilbo, who emphasized class tensions and racial segregation, attacking Percy as a representative of the aristocracy of the state and for taking a progressive stance on race relations.

Vardaman, however, would only serve one term, losing renomination in 1918, primarily due to his vote against entry into World War I.

Montana 

One-term Republican Joseph M. Dixon ran for re-election as a Progressive, but lost to Democrat Thomas J. Walsh.

The Montana Legislature then unanimously elected Walsh January 14, 1913.

Walsh would be re-elected four more times and serve for 20 years until his 1933 death.  Dixon, meanwhile, would go on to become Governor of Montana from 1921 to 1925.

Nebraska 

First-term Republican Norris Brown lost renomination to George W. Norris, who was then elected January 21, 1913.

Despite the Democratic majority, the Nebraska legislature elected Republican Norris unanimously, upholding the popular vote.

Norris would serve for thirty years, winning two more elections as a Republican and one as an Independent but losing re-election in 1942.

Nevada (special) 

Republican senator George S. Nixon died June 5, 1912. Republican former-judge William A. Massey was appointed July 1, 1912 to continue the term that would end in 1917, pending a special election.  In November 1912, Massey lost the popular vote for the special election to Democratic attorney Key Pittman was elected by the Nevada Legislature January 28, 1913.

Pittman had a small plurality in the November 1912 popular vote, but the legislature elected him almost unanimously.

Massey died the next year, and Pittman would go on to serve for 27 more years and win re-election four times, serving as President pro tempore throughout the New Deal.

New Hampshire 

Two-term Republican Henry E. Burnham decided to retire.  The New Hampshire legislature failed to elect a new senator after 42 votes, so the March 4, 1913 term begin with the seat vacant.

Finally, on March 26, 1913 on the 43rd vote, Democrat Henry F. Hollis was elected with the required majority, albeit slight.  Hollis was a former candidate for U.S. House of Representatives (in 1900), and twice for Governor of New Hampshire (in 1902 and 1904).

Hollis would retire after a single term and be replaced, in a popular vote, by Republican Henry W. Keyes.

New Jersey 

One-term incumbent Republican Frank O. Briggs lost re-election to Democratic state judge (and former member of the U.S. House) William Hughes.  The New Jersey Legislature elected Hughes January 28, 1913.

Briggs, died just a few months later on May 8, 1913.  Hughes would not serve the complete term, dying January 30, 1918, just before the next scheduled election.

New Mexico

New Mexico (initial) 

New Mexico became a new state January 6, 1912, with senators in classes 1 (ending 1917) and 2 (ending 1913).  On March 27, 1912, the state elected its initial senators on the eighth ballot: Republican Thomas B. Catron, an early advocate for New Mexico statehood who had marshaled the territorial Republican Party to lobby Republicans at the national level for New Mexico's admission to the Union, and Republican Albert B. Fall, a powerful attorney, former territorial attorney general, future Secretary of the Interior, and instigator of the Teapot Dome scandal)

Catron made a personal alliance with Fall, ensuring that each of them would be elected.  This alliance antagonized New Mexicans of Spanish heritage, who had hoped that one of their own would become a Senator.

New Mexico (regular) 
Fall's term would end in March 1913, so he was up for re-election shortly after his initial term began.

The bitterness over Catron and Fall's alliance made Fall a target of the local Republican Party, as they believed Fall had not contributed sufficiently to their efforts to secure New Mexico's statehood, and was not worthy of their nomination. The selection of Catron and Fall also disappointed Hispanics, who had hoped that one of their own would be selected.  Fall was also severely disliked by Democrats.

After various votes, the legislature re-elected Fall January 28, 1913. Governor McDonald, on the advice of his Democratic legal advisor, Summers Burkhart, said that the legislature's procedure had been illegal, and failed to sign the credentialing papers in an attempt to oust Fall by forcing a special session of the legislature and a new vote. The attempt failed; Fall won the special legislative election.

North Carolina 

Two-term Democrat Furnifold Simmons was easily re-elected January 21, 1913.  Simmons was a staunch segregationist, white supremacist and a leading perpetrator of the Wilmington insurrection of 1898.

Simmons would be re-elected twice more after this and serve until 1931, when he fell out with the national Democratic Party.

Oklahoma 

One term Democrat Robert L. Owen was re-elected over token opposition from Governor of Oklahoma Charles N. Haskell in the Democratic primary and perennial Republican candidate Joseph T. Dickerson.

Owen was formally and unanimously elected by the Oklahoma Legislature January 21, 1913.

Owen would run for U.S. president (failing to achieve his party's nomination), and then serve a third and final term as the young state's initial Class 2 senator, retiring in 1925.

Oregon 

One-term Republican Jonathan Bourne Jr. had championed direct-election of senators but lost renomination as a Republican.  He then ran in the popular election as a "Popular Government" candidate, but also lost re-election.  Democratic Mayor of Portland Harry Lane was elected.

The ballot was cluttered. In addition to the Lane and Ben Selling, candidate of the conservative wing of the Republican Party, progressive Republicans had other electoral alternatives, including the candidate and the incumbent senator Jonathan Bourne Jr., who had failed to win the renomination of the Republican party and ran as the "Popular Government" nominee as a result. Meanwhile, Benjamin F. Ramp stood for the Socialists and yet another candidate was the nominee of the Prohibition Party. Each of these six candidates took more than 5% of the vote — a fact which enabled the Lane to win election with a plurality of the vote in solidly Republican Oregon. Intent on proving himself a man of the people, Harry Lane set what might be a record for campaign frugality in his victorious effort, with his entire race run for $75 plus travel expenses.

The Oregon Legislature thereupon elected Lane to the seat January 21, 1913, ratifying the popular selection made in the November 1912 elections.

Both senators voting for Selling declared that they voted to protest a new system of nomination.

Lane died in office on May 23, 1917.

Rhode Island 

Three-term Republican George P. Wetmore retired and was replaced by Republican judge LeBaron Colt January 21, 1913.

Both senators voting for Selling declared that they voted to protest a new system of nomination.

The following day, the Joint Assembly formally declared Colt elected.  Colt resigned February 7, 1913 from the U.S. Court of Appeals for the First Circuit, in which he'd served since 1891.

Colt would be re-elected in 1918, and die near the end of that second term on August 18, 1824.

South Carolina 
 

The South Carolina race was mostly a Democratic primary election held the previous summer on August 27, 1912. The Democratic Party of South Carolina organized primary elections for the U.S. Senate beginning in 1896 and the General Assembly would confirm the choice of the Democratic voters.

Incumbent Democrat Benjamin Tillman, serving since 1895, drew opposition in the Democratic primary for the first time during his career.  He had long avoided any opposition because of his influence in the Democratic Party in the state, but by 1912 he had moderated his positions and lost the radical edge that had allowed him to build up a hard core following of support.  The radicals in the state electorate had thrown their support to Coleman Livingston Blease in the gubernatorial election of 1910 and the Bleasites were determined to knock his chief opponent, Tillman, out of office.  W. Jasper Talbert emerged as the candidate of the Bleasites and Nathaniel B. Dial entered the race as an alternative to the two.  The voters of the state split their support between the Tillmanite and Bleasite factions as both Tillman and Blease won their respective primaries.

Tillman won the Democratic primary.

Tillman was then re-elected January 28, 1913 by the General Assembly for another six-year term.

Election by the South Carolina legislature:
 Vote in the South Carolina Senate: Unanimous (37 votes of 37 senators voting)
 Vote in the South Carolina House of Representatives: Unanimous (114 votes of the 114 members voting)

South Dakota 

Two-term Republican Robert J. Gamble lost renomination.

Republican Thomas Sterling was then elected January 22, 1913 with 97 votes

Tennessee 

One-term Democrat Robert Love Taylor died March 31, 1912 and Republican Newell Sanders was appointed in his place, pending a special election.  Sanders was not a candidate either election

The Tennessee legislature elected two senators: one to the next term and one to finish the current term.

Tennessee (regular) 

Chief Justice Of The Tennessee Supreme Court John K. Shields was elected January 23, 1913 to the next term beginning March 4, 1913. He had not been a candidate in the special election.

Shields would be re-elected in 1918, but lose renomination in 1924.

Tennessee (special) 

Democrat William R. Webb, the founder of the Webb School and former Confederate soldier, was elected January 23, 1913 to finish the term ending March 3, 1913. Webb was not a candidate in the general election.

The election was then made unanimous by motion of the joint convention.

Texas 

Two-term Democrat Joseph Weldon Bailey resigned January 3, 1913 and Democrat Rienzi M. Johnston was appointed January 4, 1913 to continue the term, pending a special election.  In fact, Texas held would hold two elections January 28, 1913: a special election for the term ending March 3, 1913, and a general election for the next term starting March 4, 1913, both were won by Democratic congressman Morris Sheppard.

Texas (special) 

There was a Democratic Primary July 27, 1912.  Morris Shppard, C. B. Randell, Mat Zollner, and Jake Wolters were candidates. Sheppard received a plurality of the (approximately 8,000) votes.

Appointee Rienzi M. Johnston ran for but lost election to finish the shortened term.

Following his brief 25-day Senate term, Johnston returned to Houston and resumed his role as editor of the Houston Post. He retired from the newspaper business in 1919.

Texas (regular) 

Perhaps due to the overwhelming support for the special election, Sheppard had no opposition in the subsequent general election.

Sheppard would win re-election four times, serving until his death in 1941.

Virginia 

Virginia held non-binding primaries September 7, 1911 for both the class 2 seat held by Democrat Thomas S. Martin, who was running for re-election, and the class 1 seat held by Democrat Claude Swanson, who had been appointed to fill a vacancy.

Virginia (special) 

Democrat John W. Daniel died June 29, 1910, and Democrat Claude A. Swanson, a former Governor of Virginia and former Congressman, was appointed August 1, 1910 to finish the term ending March 1911 and again appointed February 28, 1911 to begin the 1911–1917 term, pending a special election.

Swanson won the class 1 Democratic primary for the term ending in 1917 with 67,495 votes over (future senator) Carter Glass's 28,757 votes.

On January 24, 1912, the Virginia General Assembly unanimously elected Swanson.

Virginia (regular) 

Three-term incumbent Democrat Thomas S. Martin won the Democratic primary for the class 2 term ending in 1919, receiving 57,120 votes to 25,005 for William Atkinson Jones.

On January 24, 1912, the Virginia General Assembly unanimously elected Martin.

West Virginia 

Democrat Clarence Watson had been elected in 1911 to finish a vacant term, but he lost re-election February 21, 1913 to Republican federal judge Nathan Goff Jr. after multiple deadlocked ballots.

Goff would remain a judge until April 1, 1913 before taking his Senate seat.  He would only serve the one term, retiring in 1919 due to ill-health and having barely cast any roll call votes throughout his Senate career. Goff held onto his seat despite being almost entirely absent from his duties in the Senate.

Wyoming 

Four-term Republican Francis E. Warren was re-elected January 28, 1913.

Kendrick would be elected to the other seat in 1916.

Warren would be re-elected two more times, becoming the Dean of the United States Senate, and serve until his death in 1929.

See also 
 1912 United States elections
 1912 United States House of Representatives elections
 1912 United States presidential election
 62nd United States Congress
 63rd United States Congress

Notes

References

Sources 
 
 , with election stories from Rhode Island, Iowa, Nebraska, Oklahoma, Minnesota, South Dakota, Oregon, Delaware, New Hampshire, Tennessee, Wyoming, Idaho, West Virginia, and Illinois. Some are results and some are deadlocks.